Allisonella is a Gram-negative, ovoid-shaped, histamine-producing and non-motile genus of bacteria from the family of Veillonellaceae with one known species (Allisonella histaminiformans). Allisonella is named after the American microbiologist M. J. Allison.

References

 

Monotypic bacteria genera
Bacteria genera